Noémi Dakos (born 2 March 1991) is a Hungarian handballer who plays for MTK Budapest as a line player.

Achievements
Nemzeti Bajnokság I:
Silver Medallist: 2010, 2011
Bronze Medallist: 2009
Magyar Kupa:
Silver Medallist: 2009, 2011

References

External links
 Noémi Dakos career statistics at Worldhandball

1991 births
Living people
Sportspeople from Debrecen
Hungarian female handball players